Benjamin the Timid is a 1916 German silent comedy film directed by William Karfiol and starring Senta Söneland, Reinhold Schünzel and Wilhelm Diegelmann.

Cast

References

Bibliography

External links

1916 films
Films of the German Empire
German silent feature films
Films directed by William Karfiol
German black-and-white films
German comedy films
1916 comedy films
Silent comedy films
1910s German films